Hennique is a French surname. It may refer to:

 Agathon Hennique (1810–1870), French soldier, governor of French Guiana
 Léon Hennique (1850–1935), French naturalistic novelist and playwright
 Nicolette Hennique (born 1886), French symbolist poet